Sebangphay  is a district (muang) of Khammouane province in mid-Laos. The district was badly affected by floods caused by heavy rain in July 2011, affecting rice farmland in the district, inundating over 200 hectares. Floods occurred also in August 2014.

References

Districts of Khammouane province